The Cincinnati Reds Hall of Fame and Museum is an entity established by Major League Baseball's Cincinnati Reds franchise that pays homage to the team's past through displays, photographs and multimedia. It was instituted in 1958 to recognize the career of former Cincinnati Reds players, managers and front-office executives. It is adjacent to  Great American Ball Park on the banks of the Ohio River. Currently, the Hall of Fame section is home to 81 inductees. These inductees include players, managers & executives who were involved in Cincinnati's baseball legacy, which dates back to 1869, the year the original Cincinnati Red Stockings took the field. Inductions take place every other year.

History 
The Reds first teamed up with the Cincinnati Chapter of Commerce in 1958 to promote the inductions, which were voted on by Reds fans. Nevertheless, no induction took place in 1985, and starting in 1989, the discontinuation of the ceremonies lasted for nine years. In , Reds executive John Allen revived the inductions and turned over voting to the local chapter of the Baseball Writers' Association of America, which also votes annually for the team's Most Valuable Player and pitcher. The museum opened September 25, 2004, next to Great American Ball Park. The museum showcases such unique items such as World Series trophies (from 1975, 1976 and 1990), the scorebook from the 1869 Cincinnati Red Stockings (baseball's first professional team), MVP trophies of Johnny Bench and Joe Morgan, a gallery of the Reds Hall of Fame plaques and other items. Rick Walls took over the role of museum executive director on August 1, 2007, for Greg Rhodes (the museum's first executive director), who remained with the Cincinnati Reds as team historian.

Past exhibits
In 2010 The Hall featured a Pete Rose Exhibit, focusing on the playing career of baseball's all time hits leader, currently under a lifetime ban from baseball. Artifacts include: the bat and ball from hit 4192; balls from hits leading up to 4192; artifacts from the Crosley and Riverfront/Cinergy years; gloves that Rose wore playing outfield, 2nd base, 3rd base, and 1st base; a uniform shirt from Rose's High School (Western Hills – also the alma mater of major leaguers Don Zimmer, Eddie Brinkman, Russ Nixon, and others); baseball cards from Rose's career; Sports Illustrated covers of Rose; the "wall of balls" representing all 4256 of Rose's hits; and other items.

In 2009 the museum launched its Crosley Field exhibit honoring the team's former ballpark.

The Reds Hall of Fame unveiled a statue of Hall of Famer Johnny Bench on September 17, 2011.  The statue of Bench, one of the stars of the Big Red Machine, features him in a throwing motion toward an imaginary second base.  September 17, was the anniversary of Johnny Bench Night at Riverfront Stadium in 1983, when Bench hit a two-run, game tying home run in the third inning.

Cincinnati Reds Hall of Fame members

See also
Cincinnati Reds award winners and league leaders

References

External links
Cincinnati Reds Hall of Fame & Museum official webpage

Cincinnati Reds
Major League Baseball museums and halls of fame
Halls of fame in Ohio
Sports museums in Ohio
Museums in Cincinnati
Sports in Cincinnati
Awards established in 1958
1958 establishments in Ohio
Museums established in 2004
2004 establishments in Ohio
Hall of Fame